Austroponera is a ponerine genus of ants found in Australia and New Zealand, hence the prefix "Austro-".

Species
Extant:
Austroponera castanea (Mayr, 1865)
Austroponera castaneicolor (Dalla Torre, 1893)
Austroponera rufonigra (Clark, 1934)

Fossil:
Austroponera schneideri Kaulfuss and Dlussky, 2016

References

Ponerinae
Ant genera
Hymenoptera of Australia
Ants of New Zealand